Tillandsia aizoides is a species of flowering plant within the genus Tillandsia. This species is native to Bolivia.

References

aizoides
Flora of Bolivia